Alberto Arévalo Alcon (born 8 February 1995) is a Spanish diver. He competed in the 2020 Summer Olympics.

References

External links
 

1995 births
Living people
Spanish male divers
Olympic divers of Spain
Divers at the 2020 Summer Olympics
Sportspeople from Madrid